Fabian Stoller (born 31 March 1988) is a Swiss football midfielder, who currently plays for FC Breitenrain Bern.

References

External links
 Weltfussball profile  
 football.ch profile
 

1988 births
Living people
Swiss men's footballers
Swiss expatriate footballers
Expatriate footballers in Israel
Expatriate footballers in Greece
Expatriate footballers in Cyprus
FC Thun players
FC Locarno players
Hapoel Petah Tikva F.C. players
Hapoel Haifa F.C. players
Platanias F.C. players
Ethnikos Achna FC players
FC Aarau players
Israeli Premier League players
Swiss Super League players
Super League Greece players
Cypriot First Division players
Association football midfielders
Sportspeople from Lucerne